Chris Wooding (born 28 February 1977) is a British writer born in Leicester, and now living in London. His first book, Crashing, which he wrote at the age of nineteen, was published in 1998 when he was twenty-one. Since then he has written many more, including The Haunting of Alaizabel Cray, which was silver runner-up for the Nestlé Smarties Book Prize, and Poison, which won the Lancashire Children's Book of the Year. He is also the author of three different, completed series; Broken Sky, an anime-influenced fantasy serial for children, Braided Path, a fantasy trilogy for adults, and Malice, a young adult fantasy that mixes graphic novel with the traditional novel; as well as another, four-part series, Tales of the Ketty Jay, a steampunk sci-fi fantasy for adults.

Works

Braided Path 
 The Weavers of Saramyr (2003)
 The Skein of Lament (2004)
 The Ascendancy Veil (2005)

Malice 
 Malice (2009)
 Havoc (2010)

Tales of the Ketty Jay 
 Retribution Falls (2009)
 The Black Lung Captain (2010)
 The Iron Jackal (2011)
 The Ace of Skulls (2013)

The Darkwater Legacy 
 The Ember Blade (2019)
 The Shadow Casket (2023)

Standalone novels
 Crashing (1998)
 Catchman (1998)
 Kerosene (1999)
 Broken Sky series (1999–2001)
 The Haunting of Alaizabel Cray (2001)
 Poison (2003)
 Storm Thief (2006)
 The Fade (2007)
 Pandemonium (2012)
 Silver (2013)
 Velocity (2015)

Awards and nominations
 2001: The Haunting of Alaizabel Cray won the Nestlé Smarties Book Prize Silver Award (runner-up), category 9–11 years
 2004: Poison won the Lancashire Children's Book of the Year
 2004: Poison nominated for the Carnegie Medal
 2007: Storm Thief nominated for the Carnegie Medal
 2010: Retribution Falls shortlisted for the Arthur C. Clarke Award

References

External links
 
 
 Interview at Transition Tradition Magazine
 
 

1977 births
British children's writers
British fantasy writers
Steampunk writers
Living people
English male novelists